Muzafarpur may refer to

 Muzafarpur Janubi, Mianwali District, Punjab, Pakistan.
 Muzafarpur Shumali, Mianwali District, Punjab, Pakistan.
 Muzaffarpur, Bihar, India